The Lake of Thinking (translit. I limni ton pothon, also known as The Lagoon of Desire) is a 1958 Greek drama film directed by Giorgos Zervos. The film was selected as the Greek entry for the Best Foreign Language Film at the 30th Academy Awards, but was not accepted as a nominee.

Cast
 Tzeni Karezi as Miranda Kalibouka
 Giorgos Fountas as Christos Razis
 Eleni Zafeiriou as Mrs. Razi
 Koula Agagiotou
 Christoforos Nezer as Asimakis
 Nikos Fermas
 Sonia Zoidou as Asimoula

See also
 List of submissions to the 30th Academy Awards for Best Foreign Language Film
 List of Greek submissions for the Academy Award for Best Foreign Language Film

References

External links
 

1958 films
Greek drama films
1950s Greek-language films
1958 drama films
Greek black-and-white films
Films scored by Manos Hatzidakis